1971 Soviet Second League was a Soviet competition in the Soviet Second League.

Qualifying groups

Group I [Ukraine]

Group II [Centre and Northwest]
 [3-1-0 point system]

Group III [Volga and Greater Caucasus]

Group IV [Russia and Georgia]

Group V [Ural and Central Asia]

Group VI (Siberia and Kazakhstan)
 [3-1-0 point system]

Promotion playoffs

Final group 
 [Oct 31 – Nov 12, Sochi]

Additional play-off 
 [Nov 20, 24]

References
 All-Soviet Archive Site
 Results. RSSSF

Soviet Second League seasons
3
Soviet
Soviet